Pierbach is a municipality in the district of Freistadt in the Austrian state of Upper Austria.

Geography
Pierbach lies in the Mühlviertel. About 10 percent of the municipality is forest and 12 percent farmland.

References

Cities and towns in Freistadt District